The Mattatuck Drum Band is an American fife and drum corps organized in 1767 in Farmingbury, now Wolcott, Connecticut. According to its website, it is the oldest fife and drum corps in the U.S. with continuous membership.

References

American instrumental musical groups
Fife players
Musical groups established in the 1760s
1767 establishments in Connecticut